Carmenta haematica, the Argentine root borer, is a moth of the family Sesiidae. It was described by Ureta in 1956, and is known from Argentina and Chile.

Adults are day flying and have orange (female) or clear (male) wings with a wingspan of 20–24 mm. Adults emerge in late summer, and larvae develop during the fall, winter and spring. The species is mostly univoltine, but the presence of some large larvae and pupae during most months indicated some variation.

The larva of the species have been found on plants in the genus Gutierrezia, including Gutierrezia solbrigii and Grindelia chiloensis. They have seven instars and are about 24 mm long when fully grown. The larvae enter the plant at the base of the twigs or leaves or sometimes bore directly into the crowns. They are cannibalistic after the second instar and usually only one large larva occurs in a single plant. Larger larvae tunnel in the larger roots and make an exit hole in a large stem. A silken tube is often protruded from the exit hole.

References

Sesiidae
Moths described in 1956